Imam-Quli Khan (died 1632) was an Iranian military and political leader of Georgian origin who served as a governor of Fars, Lar and Bahrain for the shahs Abbas I and Safi.

Biography
Imam-Quli Khan was the son of Allahverdi Khan (Undiladze), the celebrated Georgian general in the service of Iran’s Safavid dynasty. Imam-Quli Khan is first mentioned as governor of Lar in Fars in 1610. He succeeded his father as governor-general (beglarbeg) of Fars in 1615, but retained his position at Lar and was granted the rank of an amir of the divan by Shah Abbas I. In 1619-20, Imam-Quli Khan oversaw Abbas’s project to link the headwaters of the Karun and Zayandarud rivers in order to enhance the water supply of his capital, Isfahan. Shah Abbas placed complete trust in Imam-Quli Khan who grew in influence and prestige and became one of the wealthiest khans of the Safavid empire. One day, Shah Abbas even jokingly said to Imam-Quli: "I request, Imam-Quli, that you will spend one dirham less per day, that there may exist some slight difference between the disbursements of a khan and a king!"

Imam-Quli built a madrasa and many palaces in Shiraz and the still standing bridge Pol-e Khan over the Kor at Marvdasht.

Being in charge of the Safavids' southern possessions, Imam-Quli Khan continued his father’s policy of undermining the Portuguese positions in the Persian Gulf. In 1621, he persuaded the English East India Company to cooperate with the Persians by threatening to cancel the trading privileges that had been granted to the company by the shah in 1615. As a result, Imam-Quli Khan’s army aided by the English navy captured the strategic Portuguese fort on the island of Qeshm and laid a siege to Hormuz, which surrendered after a defence of ten weeks on 22 April 1622. The khan’s military exploits are commemorated in the works by the poet Qadri from Fars. 

According to the Safavid historian Fazli Khuzani, Imam-Quli Khan had 22 daughters, of which some were married to Safavid Georgian gholams of noble origin in 1622. In 1626, when Imam-Quli's daughter and son-in-law Anduqapar Amilakhori were captured by rebellious Georgians, Abbas I sent a large army in order to rescue them.

Fall and death 

After the death of Abbas, Imam-Quli Khan found himself in disagreement with new favorites of Shah Safi, Abbas’s successor to the throne of Persia, and became marginalized. This circumstance lasted until he and his two sons, one of them being Safiqoli Khan, were put to death at Safi's orders in late 1632, while his vast possessions were converted into the crown domain in 1633. This formed the prelude to the massacre of the rest of his family. Only his brother, Daud Khan, survived as he had fled to Georgia. Though the Undiladze Safavid Georgian line was nearly completely eliminated after the purge, the succession of the line amongst the court elites was assured by Ja'far Qoli, a grandson of Imam-Quli Khan by a daughter. A statue to Imam-Quli Khan was erected in Qeshm in the 1990s.

References

Sources 

 
Roger M. Savory, EMĀMQOLĪ KHAN, Encyclopaedia Iranica, Online Edition (LINK)

1632 deaths
Safavid generals
Iranian people of Georgian descent
Executed Iranian people
Shia Muslims from Georgia (country)
Year of birth unknown
Executed people from Georgia (country)
People executed by Safavid Iran
Safavid governors of Fars
Undiladze
Safavid governors of Lar
17th-century people of Safavid Iran
Safavid ghilman